Volders is a surname. Notable people with the surname include:

Lancelot Volders (1636–1723), Flemish painter
Mark Volders (born 1977), Belgian footballer

See also
Volkers